Branislav Rzeszoto (born 3 November 1975 in Žilina) is a Slovakian former football goalkeeper.

Club career
Rzeszoto previously played for MŠK Žilina, FC Spartak Trnava and ŠK Slovan Bratislava in the Slovak Corgoň Liga. He also played for FC Tescoma Zlín and FC Vysočina Jihlava in the Czech Gambrinus liga. Rzeszoto also had a brief spell with APOEL in Cyprus.

References 

Living people
1975 births
Slovak footballers
Slovak expatriate footballers
Slovakia international footballers
MŠK Žilina players
FC Fastav Zlín players
FC Spartak Trnava players
FC Vysočina Jihlava players
ŠK Slovan Bratislava players
APOEL FC players
Ascoli Calcio 1898 F.C. players
Slovak Super Liga players
Cypriot First Division players
Expatriate footballers in the Czech Republic
Slovak expatriate sportspeople in the Czech Republic
Expatriate footballers in Cyprus
Association football goalkeepers
Sportspeople from Žilina